Braux is a commune in the Alpes-de-Haute-Provence department in southeastern France.

Geography 
The village is located at 950m of altitude, at the end of a road, in the valley of Coulomp. The road leading to it continues along a semi-tarred trail to the hamlet of Chabrières.

The adjoining communities of Braux are Le Fugeret, Castellet-lès-Sausses, Saint-Benoît and Annot.

Bois du Fa to the north of the village.

Geology 
The village is set on a local resurgence of sandstone dating from the Oligocene (the same as Ann 
ot) in the middle of marl and limestone of the Jurassic and the Eocene.

Relief 
 Crest of Clos Martin (1,522 m and 1,607 m);
 Rock of Pelloussis (1,340 m)

Environment 
The commune counts 639 ha of woods and forests.

Natural and technological hazards 
None of the 200 municipalities in the department is in a zero seismic risk zone. Braux is in zone 1b (low risk) according to the deterministic classification of 1991, based on historical earthquakes, and zone 4 (medium risk) according to the probabilistic classification EC8 of 2011. The municipality of Braux is also exposed to three other natural hazards:
 Forest fire,
 flood,
 Land movement: the municipality is almost entirely concerned by an average to high risk.
The commune of Braux is not exposed to any of the risks of technological origin identified by the prefecture.

No plan for risk prevention foreseeable natural (PPR) exists for the municipality and DICRIM are not.

The most sensitive earthquake in the commune is that of February 23, 1887, with a macro-seismic intensity of VII on the scale MSK and Imperia-Bussana for epicenter. Among the recent landslides and landslides, the most important ones are those of 1978 and 5 November 1994. One of 1994 concerns an area of 13 hectares on a thickness of 6 m, below the Rocher des Meules (Ravine de la Lauriere ), which had won several farms.

Population

See also
Communes of the Alpes-de-Haute-Provence department

References

Communes of Alpes-de-Haute-Provence
Alpes-de-Haute-Provence communes articles needing translation from French Wikipedia